Andoa was a Zaparoan language of Ecuador and Peru. It was found in the Pastaza River region of Ecuador and Peru. It is also known as Shimigae/Semigae and Gae/Gay. The Andoa people have integrated into the Quechua and now speak either Pastaza Quechua or Spanish. The last known speaker died in 1993.

References

External links
"Dos lenguas que no quieren morir." El Comercio. 22 Enero 2008.  13 Febrero 2008 .

Extinct languages of South America
Peru
Languages extinct in the 1990s